The Baba Lasoori Shah (Urdu سائیں محمد بخش المعروف باب لسوڑی شاہ ) (also known as Sain Muhammad Bakhsh) shrine is a landmark located in Faisalabad, Jhang Bazaar main city area Pakistan. It is named after Baba Lasoori Shah, who used to live under a shade of a Cordia myxa tree called lasoori. He was given the tree's name due to the symbol of the tree and his silence. After his death in 1932, the shrine became the center of religious and cultural activities. On the annual, three-day Urs celebration in March, the shrine received large numbers of visitors. On the first day, the shrine is given a ritual bath in the presence of the district administration, local politicians and the business community. The devotees bring the most beautiful chadars—embroidered shawls—and cover the shrine with them as part of their Manat, signifying the successful completion of a worldly task. Visiting groups often establish deras—social spaces—where food is cooked and served. Malangs are also an important feature of the Urs celebrations at the shrine of Baba Lasoori Shah. Langar is also another essential feature of the shrine of Baba Lasoori Shah during Urs celebrations, and is partly sponsored by the Punjab Auqaf and Religious Affairs Department and partly by public donation. It consists of Daal and bread. Some devotees send trucks of trucks to the Punjab Auqaf who organise the distribution at the shrine.

Urs and Qawwali
Qawwali music is an essential feature of the Urs celebrations as part of Sama rituals. In Sufism, Qawwali is given special sacred status in the Chishti Order and is considered a source of spiritual elevation. The Lyallpur Music school was also established near the shrine of Baba Lasoori Shah by Dulara Khan.

Rituals
The upper part of the shrine consists of a mosque for prayer. Devotees recite the Quran at the grave of the saint, touch the entrance wall and grave base, lay chaddar and roses on the grave, and take oil from the burning oil lamps to treat their diseases. Shrines also play a role in the treatment of diseases through Tabarkaat.

In the shrine of Baba Lasoori Shah, women are allowed to enter the saint's tomb in a separated area to pray for blessings such as asking for a child, a cure from a disease, elimination of poverty, or obtaining a job. Some women bring offerings of salt or burn charagh—clay lamps—with mustard oil.

See also
Baba Ratan Hindi
Baba Qaim Sain
Baba Noor Shah Wali 
HAZRAT Baba Rang Ali
HAZRAT Abu Anees SUFI Barkat Ali
HAZRAT Syed Mehmood UL Hassan Shah
HAZRAT Baba Rasheed Mast

References

Sufi shrines in Pakistan
Sufism in Pakistan
People from Faisalabad
Punjabi Sufi saints
1987 deaths